Qeshlaq-e Jitu (also Romanized as Qeshlāq-e Jītū, Qeshlāq-e Jūtū, and Qeshlāq Jūtū) is a village in Qeshlaq-e Jitu Rural District of the Central District of Qarchak County, Tehran province, Iran. At the 2006 National Census, its population was 7,346 in 1,689 households, when it was in the former Qarchak District of Varamin County. The following census in 2011 counted 6,893 people in 1,804 households. The latest census in 2016 showed a population of 7,909 people in 2,173 households, by which time the district had been separated from the county and Qarchak County established; it was the largest village in its rural district.

References 

Qarchak County

Populated places in Tehran Province

Populated places in Qarchak County